John Gough may refer to:

Sportspeople
John Gough (American football) (1900–1935), American football player and coach
John Gough (Canadian football) (born 1920s), Canadian football player
John Gough (footballer), Irish football goalkeeper
John Gough (referee) (born 1937), Irish Gaelic games match official
John Gough (sport shooter) (born 1929), English sport shooter

Other
John Gough (actor), American actor in the silent film era, including in Wives and Other Wives
John Gough (British Army officer) (1871–1915), British general and recipient of the Victoria Cross
John Gough (composer) (1903–1951), Australian-born composer, radio producer and radio playwright who relocated to the UK and worked for the BBC
John Gough (natural philosopher) (1757–1825), English natural and experimental philosopher
John Bartholomew Gough (1817–1886), American temperance orator
John George Gough (1848–1907), co-founder of the New South Wales Labour Party
John Wiedhofft Gough (1900–1976), Welsh historian